Amos Carpenter (30 October 1832 – 1866) was an English cricketer.  Carpenter's batting and bowling styles are unknown.  He was born at Chalvington, Sussex.

Carpenter made his first-class debut for Sussex against Nottinghamshire in 1853.  He made three further first-class appearances for the county, the last of which came against Surrey in 1857.  He scored a total of 20 runs in his four matches, which came at an average of 3.33, with a high score of 14.

He died at Lewes, Sussex in 1866, though the exact date is unknown.

References

External links
Amos Carpenter at ESPNcricinfo
Amos Carpenter at CricketArchive

1832 births
1866 deaths
People from Chalvington with Ripe
English cricketers
Sussex cricketers